Adult Education Quarterly is a quarterly peer-reviewed academic journal covering the field of education. It was established in 1950 and is published by SAGE Publications on behalf of the American Association of Adult and Continuing Education. , the editors-in-chief have been Ellen Boeren (University of Glasgow), Kevin M. Roessger (University of Arkansas), and Elizabeth A. Roumell (Texas A&M University).

Abstracting and indexing 
The journal is abstracted and indexed in Scopus, ERIC, EBSCO databases, ProQuest databases, and the Social Sciences Citation Index. According to the Journal Citation Reports, its 2020  impact factor is 1.968, ranking it 96th out of 238 journals in the category "Education & Educational Research".

References

External links 
 
 American Association of Adult and Continuing Education 

SAGE Publishing academic journals
English-language journals
Quarterly journals
Publications established in 1950
Education journals
Adult education